The Nanny is a 1999 Italian drama film directed by Marco Bellocchio. It was entered into the 1999 Cannes Film Festival.

Cast
 Fabrizio Bentivoglio - Prof. Mori
 Valeria Bruni Tedeschi - Vittoria Mori
 Maya Sansa - Annetta
 Jacqueline Lustig - Maddalena
 Pier Giorgio Bellocchio - Nardi
 Gisella Burinato
 Elda Alvigini - Lena
 Eleonora Danco - Patient
 Fabio Camilli - Broker
 Michele Placido - Belli Estate Patient

References

External links

1999 films
1999 drama films
Italian drama films
1990s Italian-language films
Films based on works by Luigi Pirandello
Films directed by Marco Bellocchio
Films based on short fiction
1990s Italian films